Reena Szczepanski is an American politician who is a member of the New Mexico House of Representatives for the 47th district. Elected in November 2022, she will assume office on January 1, 2023.

Early life and education 
The daughter of immigrants from India, Szczepanski was born and raised in Decatur, Georgia. She earned a Bachelor of Science degree in human biology and community health from Brown University.

Career 
Szczepanski spent six years as director of the New Mexico chapter of the Drug Policy Alliance. From 2006 to 2016, she was the executive director of Emerge New Mexico, an organization that recruits women to run for office. Szczepanski was president of the New Mexico Public Health Association and chair of the Santa Fe County Health Policy and Planning Commission. From 2017 to 2022, Szczepanski served as chief of staff for Speaker Brian Egolf. After Egolf announced that he would not seek re-election to the New Mexico House of Representatives in 2022, Szczepanski declared her candidacy to succeed him. She ran unopposed in the November general election and assumed office on January 17, 2023.

References 

Living people
People from Decatur, Georgia
Brown University alumni
Democratic Party members of the New Mexico House of Representatives
Women state legislators in New Mexico
People from Santa Fe, New Mexico
People from Santa Fe County, New Mexico
Year of birth missing (living people)